Below are the results of the 2015 World Series of Poker, held from May 27-July 14 at the Rio All Suite Hotel and Casino in Paradise, Nevada.

Key

Results

Source:

Event #1: $565 Casino Employees No Limit Hold'em

 2-Day Event: May 27–28
 Number of Entries: 688
 Total Prize Pool: $344,000
 Number of Payouts: 72
 Winning Hand:

Event #2: $5,000 No Limit Hold'em

 3-Day Event: May 27–29
 Number of Entries: 422
 Total Prize Pool: $1,983,400
 Number of Payouts: 45
 Winning Hand:

Event #3: $1,500 Omaha Hi-Lo 8 or Better

 4-Day Event: May 28–31
 Number of Entries: 918
 Total Prize Pool: $1,239,300
 Number of Payouts: 117
 Winning Hand:

Event #4: $3,000 No Limit Hold'em Shootout

 3-Day Event: May 28–30
 Number of Entries: 308
 Total Prize Pool: $840,840
 Number of Payouts: 40
 Winning Hand:

Event #5: $565 The Colossus No Limit Hold'em

 6-Day Event: May 29-June 3
 Number of Entries: 22,374
 Total Prize Pool: $11,187,000
 Number of Payouts: 2,241
 Winning Hand:

Event #6: $1,000 Hyper Hold'em

 2-Day Event: May 31-June 1 
 Number of Entries: 1,436
 Total Prize Pool: $1,292,400
 Number of Payouts: 144
 Winning Hand:

Event #7: $10,000 Limit 2-7 Triple Draw Lowball Championship

 3-Day Event: May 31-June 2
 Number of Entries: 109
 Total Prize Pool: $1,024,600
 Number of Payouts: 12
 Winning Hand:

Event #8: $1,500 Pot Limit Hold'em

 3-Day Event: June 1–3
 Number of Entries: 639
 Total Prize Pool: $862,650
 Number of Payouts: 72
 Winning Hand:

Event #9: $1,500 Razz

 3-Day Event: June 1–3
 Number of Entries: 462
 Total Prize Pool: $623,700
 Number of Payouts: 48
 Winning Hand: 3-6-K-2-7-Q-4

Event #10: $10,000 Heads Up No Limit Hold'em Championship

 3-Day Event: June 2–4
 Number of Entries: 143
 Total Prize Pool: $1,344,200
 Number of Payouts: 16
 Winning Hand:

Event #11: $1,500 Limit Hold'em

 3-Day Event: June 2–4
 Number of Entries: 660
 Total Prize Pool: $891,000
 Number of Payouts: 72
 Winning Hand:

Event #12: $1,500 No Limit Hold'em 6-Handed

 3-Day Event: June 3–5
 Number of Entries: 1,651
 Total Prize Pool: $2,228,850
 Number of Payouts: 180
 Winning Hand:

Event #13: $2,500 Omaha/Seven Card Stud Hi-Lo 8 or Better

 4-Day Event: June 3–6
 Number of Entries: 474
 Total Prize Pool: $1,078,350
 Number of Payouts: 48
 Winning Hand:

Event #14: $1,500 No Limit Hold'em Shootout

 3-Day Event: June 4–6
 Number of Entries: 1,000
 Total Prize Pool: $1,350,000
 Number of Payouts: 100
 Winning Hand:

Event #15: $10,000 Pot Limit Hold'em Championship

 3-Day Event: June 4–6
 Number of Entries: 128
 Total Prize Pool: $1,203,200
 Number of Payouts: 18
 Winning Hand:

Event #16: $1,500 Millionaire Maker No Limit Hold'em

 5-Day Event: June 5–9
 Number of Entries: 7,275
 Total Prize Pool: $9,821,250
 Number of Payouts: 747
 Winning Hand:

Event #17: $10,000 Razz Championship

 3-Day Event: June 6–8
 Number of Entries: 103
 Total Prize Pool: $968,200
 Number of Payouts: 16
 Winning Hand: 7-6-4-K-10-2-A

Event #18: $1,000 Turbo No Limit Hold'em

 2-Day Event: June 7–8 
 Number of Entries: 1,791
 Total Prize Pool: $1,611,900
 Number of Payouts: 198
 Winning Hand:

Event #19: $3,000 Limit Hold'em 6-Handed

 3-Day Event: June 7–9
 Number of Entries: 319
 Total Prize Pool: $870,870
 Number of Payouts: 36
 Winning Hand:

Event #20: $1,500 No Limit Hold'em

 4-Day Event: June 8–11
 Number of Entries: 1,844
 Total Prize Pool: $2,489,400
 Number of Payouts: 198
 Winning Hand:

Event #21: $10,000 Omaha Hi-Lo 8 or Better Championship

 3-Day Event: June 8–10
 Number of Entries: 157
 Total Prize Pool: $1,475,800
 Number of Payouts: 18
 Winning Hand:

Event #22: $1,000 No Limit Hold'em

 3-Day Event: June 9–11
 Number of Entries: 1,915
 Total Prize Pool: $1,723,500
 Number of Payouts: 198
 Winning Hand:

Event #23: $1,500 No Limit 2-7 Draw Lowball

 3-Day Event: June 9–11
 Number of Entries: 219
 Total Prize Pool: $295,650
 Number of Payouts: 28
 Winning Hand: J-8-6-3-2

Event #24: $1,500 H.O.R.S.E.

 4-Day Event: June 10–13
 Number of Entries: 772
 Total Prize Pool: $1,042,200
 Number of Payouts: 80
 Winning Hand:  (Omaha 8)

Event #25: $5,000 No Limit Hold'em 8-Handed

 4-Day Event: June 10–13 
 Number of Entries: 493
 Total Prize Pool: $2,317,100
 Number of Payouts: 56
 Winning Hand:

Event #26: $1,000 Pot Limit Omaha

 3-Day Event: June 11–13
 Number of Entries: 1,293
 Total Prize Pool: $1,163,700
 Number of Payouts: 144
 Winning Hand:

Event #27: $10,000 Seven Card Stud Championship

 3-Day Event: June 11–13
 Number of Entries: 91
 Total Prize Pool: $855,400
 Number of Payouts: 16
 Winning Hand:

Event #28: $1,500 Monster Stack No Limit Hold'em

 6-Day Event: June 12–17
 Number of Entries: 7,192
 Total Prize Pool: $9,709,200
 Number of Payouts: 720
 Winning Hand:

Event #29: $10,000 No Limit 2-7 Draw Lowball Championship

 3-Day Event: June 13–15
 Number of Entries: 77
 Total Prize Pool: $723,800
 Number of Payouts: 14
 Winning Hand: 9-7-6-4-3

Event #30: $1,000 No Limit Hold'em

 4-Day Event: June 14–17
 Number of Entries: 2,150
 Total Prize Pool: $1,935,900
 Number of Payouts: 216
 Winning Hand:

Event #31: $3,000 Pot Limit Omaha Hi-Lo 8 or Better

 3-Day Event: June 14–16
 Number of Entries: 480
 Total Prize Pool: $1,310,400
 Number of Payouts: 54
 Winning Hand:

Event #32: $5,000 No Limit Hold'em 6-Handed

 3-Day Event: June 15–17
 Number of Entries: 550
 Total Prize Pool: $2,585,000
 Number of Payouts: 60
 Winning Hand:

Event #33: $1,500 Limit 2-7 Triple Draw Lowball

 3-Day Event: June 15–17
 Number of Entries: 388
 Total Prize Pool: $257,850
 Number of Payouts: 42
 Winning Hand: 9-7-6-4-2

Event #34: $1,500 Split Format Hold'em

 4-Day Event: June 16–19 
 Number of Entries: 873
 Total Prize Pool: $436,050
 Number of Payouts: 92
 Winning Hand:

Event #35: $3,000 H.O.R.S.E.

 4-Day Event: June 16–19
 Number of Entries: 376
 Total Prize Pool: $1,026,480
 Number of Payouts: 40
 Winning Hand:  (Seven Card Stud)

Event #36: $1,500 Pot Limit Omaha

 4-Day Event: June 17–20
 Number of Entries: 978
 Total Prize Pool: $1,320,300
 Number of Payouts: 117
 Winning Hand:

Event #37: $10,000 No Limit Hold'em 6-Handed Championship

 3-Day Event: June 17–19
 Number of Entries: 259
 Total Prize Pool: $2,434,600
 Number of Payouts: 30
 Winning Hand:

Event #38: $3,000 No Limit Hold'em

 4-Day Event: June 18–21
 Number of Entries: 989
 Total Prize Pool: $2,699,970
 Number of Payouts: 117
 Winning Hand:

Event #39: $1,500 Ten-Game Mix

 3-Day Event: June 18–20
 Number of Entries: 380
 Total Prize Pool: $513,000
 Number of Payouts: 42
 Winning Hand:  (Limit Hold'em)

Event #40: $1,000 Seniors No Limit Hold'em Championship

 4-Day Event: June 19–22
 Number of Entries: 4,193
 Total Prize Pool: $3,773,700
 Number of Payouts: 423
 Winning Hand:

Event #41: $10,000 Seven Card Stud Hi-Lo 8 or Better Championship

 3-Day Event: June 19–21
 Number of Entries: 111
 Total Prize Pool:  $1,043,400
 Number of Payouts: 16
 Winning Hand:

Event #42: $1,500 Extended Play No Limit Hold'em

 5-Day Event: June 20–24 
 Number of Entries: 1,914
 Total Prize Pool: $2,583,900
 Number of Payouts: 198
 Winning Hand:

Event #43: $1,000 Super Seniors No Limit Hold'em

 3-Day Event: June 21–23
 Number of Entries: 1,533
 Total Prize Pool: $1,379,700
 Number of Payouts: 171
 Winning Hand:

Event #44: $50,000 The Poker Players Championship

 5-Day Event: June 21–25 
 Number of Entries: 84
 Total Prize Pool: $4,032,000
 Number of Payouts: 12
 Winning Hand:  (Pot Limit Omaha)

Event #45: $1,500 No Limit Hold'em

 4-Day Event: June 22–25
 Number of Entries: 1,655
 Total Prize Pool: $2,234,250
 Number of Payouts: 171
 Winning Hand:

Event #46: $3,000 Pot Limit Omaha 6-Handed

 4-Day Event: June 22–25
 Number of Entries: 682
 Total Prize Pool: $1,861,860
 Number of Payouts: 78
 Winning Hand:

Event #47: $2,500 No Limit Hold'em

 4-Day Event: June 23–26
 Number of Entries: 1,244
 Total Prize Pool: $2,830,100
 Number of Payouts: 144
 Winning Hand:

Event #48: $1,500 Seven Card Stud

 3-Day Event: June 23–25
 Number of Entries: 327
 Total Prize Pool: $441,450
 Number of Payouts: 40
 Winning Hand:

Event #49: $1,500 Pot Limit Omaha Hi-Lo 8 or Better

 3-Day Event: June 24–26
 Number of Entries: 815
 Total Prize Pool: $1,100,250
 Number of Payouts: 90
 Winning Hand:

Event #50: $10,000 Limit Hold'em Championship

 3-Day Event: June 24–26
 Number of Entries: 117
 Total Prize Pool: $1,099,800
 Number of Payouts: 18
 Winning Hand:

Event #51: $3,000 No Limit Hold'em 6-Handed

 4-Day Event: June 25–28
 Number of Entries: 1,043
 Total Prize Pool: $2,847,390
 Number of Payouts: 108
 Winning Hand:

Event #52: $1,500 Dealers Choice

 3-Day Event: June 25–27
 Number of Entries: 357
 Total Prize Pool: $481,950
 Number of Payouts: 36
 Winning Hand:  (Hold'em)

Event #53: $10,000/$1,000 Ladies No Limit Hold'em Championship

 3-Day Event: June 26–28
 Number of Entries: 795
 Total Prize Pool: $715,500
 Number of Payouts: 81
 Winning Hand:

Event #54: $10,000 Pot Limit Omaha Championship

 3-Day Event: June 26–28
 Number of Entries: 387
 Total Prize Pool: $3,637,800
 Number of Payouts: 40
 Winning Hand:

Event #55: $1,500 Draftkings 50/50 No Limit Hold'em

 3-Day Event: June 27–29
 Number of Entries: 1,123
 Total Prize Pool: $1,516,050
 Number of Payouts: 562
 Winning Hand:

Event #56: $5,000 Turbo No Limit Hold'em

 2-Day Event: June 27–28 
 Number of Entries: 454
 Total Prize Pool: $2,133,800
 Number of Payouts: 54
 Winning Hand:

Event #57: $1,000 No Limit Hold'em

 4-Day Event: June 28-July 1
 Number of Entries: 2,497
 Total Prize Pool: $2,247,300
 Number of Payouts: 270
 Winning Hand:

Event #58: $111,111 High Roller for One Drop

 2-Day Event: June 28–29
 Number of Entries: 135
 Total Prize Pool: $14,249,925
 Number of Payouts: 16
 Winning Hand:

Event #59: $1,500 No Limit Hold'em

 4-Day Event: June 29-July 2
 Number of Entries: 2,155
 Total Prize Pool: $2,909,250
 Number of Payouts: 216
 Winning Hand:

Event #60: $25,000 High Roller Pot Limit Omaha

 4-Day Event: June 29-July 2 
 Number of Entries: 175
 Total Prize Pool: $4,156,250
 Number of Payouts: 24
 Winning Hand:

Event #61: $1,111 The Little One for One Drop

 4-Day Event: June 30-July 3 
 Number of Entries: 4,555
 Total Prize Pool: $4,099,500
 Number of Payouts: 468
 Winning Hand:

Event #62: $1,500 Bounty No Limit Hold'em

 4-Day Event: July 1–4
 Number of Entries: 2,178
 Total Prize Pool: $2,940,300
 Number of Payouts: 243
 Winning Hand:

Event #63: $10,000 H.O.R.S.E. Championship

 3-Day Event: July 1–3
 Number of Entries: 204
 Total Prize Pool: $1,917,000
 Number of Payouts: 24
 Winning Hand:  (Seven Card Stud Hi-Lo)

Event #64: $1,000 WSOP.com Online No Limit Hold'em

 2-Day Event: July 2–4
 Number of Entries: 905
 Total Prize Pool: $859,750
 Number of Payouts: 100
 Winning Hand:

Event #65: $1,500 Seven Card Stud Hi-Lo 8 or Better

 4-Day Event: July 2–5
 Number of Entries: 547
 Total Prize Pool: $738,450
 Number of Payouts: 56
 Winning Hand:

Event #66: $777 Lucky Sevens No Limit Hold'em

 4-Day Event: July 3–6
 Number of Entries: 4,422
 Total Prize Pool: $3,095,400
 Number of Payouts: 468
 Winning Hand:

Event #67: $10,000 Dealers Choice Championship

 3-Day Event: July 3–5
 Number of Entries: 108
 Total Prize Pool: $1,015,200
 Number of Payouts: 12
 Winning Hand: 8-7-6-3-2 (2-7 Triple Draw)

Event #68: $10,000 No Limit Hold'em Main Event

 10-Day Event: July 5–14
 Final Table: November 8–10
 Number of Entries: 6,420
 Total Prize Pool: $60,348,000
 Number of Payouts: 1,000
 Winning Hand:

References

External links
WSOP schedule

World Series of Poker
World Series of Poker
World Series of Poker Results, 2015